Histone deacetylase 1 (HDAC1) is an enzyme that in humans is encoded by the HDAC1 gene.

Function 

Histone acetylation and deacetylation, catalyzed by multisubunit complexes, play a key role in the regulation of eukaryotic gene expression. The protein encoded by this gene belongs to the histone deacetylase/acuc/apha family and is a component of the histone deacetylase complex. It also interacts with retinoblastoma tumor-suppressor protein and this complex is a key element in the control of cell proliferation and differentiation. Together with metastasis-associated protein-2 MTA2, it deacetylates p53 and modulates its effect on cell growth and apoptosis.

Model organisms 

Model organisms have been used in the study of HDAC1 function. A conditional knockout mouse line, called Hdac1tm1a(EUCOMM)Wtsi was generated as part of the International Knockout Mouse Consortium program — a high-throughput mutagenesis project to generate and distribute animal models of disease to interested scientists — at the Wellcome Trust Sanger Institute. 
Male and female animals underwent a standardized phenotypic screen to determine the effects of deletion. Twenty five tests were carried out and two phenotypes were reported. A reduced number of homozygous mutant embryos were identified during gestation, and none survived until weaning. The remaining tests were carried out on heterozygous mutant adult mice, and no significant abnormalities were observed in these animals.

Interactions 

HDAC1 has been shown to interact with:

 Androgen receptor, 
 BCL6, 
 BTG2, 
 BUB1B, 
 BUB1, 
 BUB3, 
 CBFA2T3, 
 CDC20, 
 CDH1, 
 CHD3, 
 CHD4, 
 COUP-TFII,
 CTBP1, 
 DDX17, 
 DDX5, 
 DNMT3A, 
 DNMT3L, 
 Death-associated protein 6, 
 EED, 
 EVI1, 
 EZH2,
 FKBP3, 
 GATA1, 
 HMG20B, 
 HSPA4, 
 HUS1, 
 Histone deacetylase 2, 
 Homeobox protein TGIF1, 
 Host cell factor C1, 
 IFRD1, 
 IKZF1, 
 ING1, 
 MBD3, 
 MIER1, 
 MLL, 
 MTA1, 
 MTA2, 
 Mad1, 
 Mdm2, 
 Methyl-CpG-binding domain protein 2, 
 Mothers against decapentaplegic homolog 2, 
 MyoD, 
 NFKB1, 
 Nuclear receptor co-repressor 2, 
 P21,
 PCNA, 
 PHF21A, 
 Prohibitin, 
 Promyelocytic leukemia protein, 
 RAD9A, 
 RBBP4, 
 RBBP7, 
 RCOR1, 
 RELA, 
 RFC1, 
 Retinoblastoma protein, 
 Retinoblastoma-like protein 1, 
 Retinoblastoma-like protein 2, 
 SAP30, 
 SATB1, 
 SIN3A, 
 SIN3B, 
 SPEN, 
 SUDS3, 
 SUV39H1, 
 Sp1 transcription factor, 
 TOP2A, 
 TOP2B,  and
 Zinc finger and BTB domain-containing protein 16.

See also 
 Histone deacetylase
 Histone deacetylase inhibitor

References

Further reading

External links 
 

EC 3.5.1
Genes mutated in mice
Δ1